Cristian Boboc (born 9 October 1995) is a Romanian rugby union player. He plays as a flanker for Romanian SuperLiga club Tomitanii Constanța.

Club career
Boboc started playing for SCM Gloria Buzău in 2018, at the age of 23 and shortly became the captain of team until 2020, the year where the team had dissolved due to financial reasons, and as a result, Boboc had transferred to Tomitanii Constanța

International career
Boboc is also selected for Romania's national team, the Oaks, making his international debut during Round 3 of 2021 Rugby Europe Championship in a test match against Los Leones.

References

External links

1995 births
Living people
Romanian rugby union players
Romania international rugby union players
SCM Gloria Buzău (rugby union) players
ACS Tomitanii Constanța players
Rugby union flankers